The Basel–Dornach railway line is a  railway line in Switzerland.

History 
The  opened a line between Dreispitz, in Basel, and Dornach, on 6 October 1902. The line was electrified from opening at 550 V DC, later increased to 600 V DC. In 1974, the Birseckbahn merged with three other companies to form Baselland Transport, which continues to own and operate the line.

Route 
It runs north-south, roughly parallel to the standard gauge Basel–Biel/Bienne railway line. Both lines cross the river Birs at Münchenstein. In Dreispitz, at the northern end of the line, the Basel–Dornach railway line crosses over the Basel–Biel/Bienne railway line and joins with the Basel–Aesch railway line The two lines then connect with the tracks of the Basel tram network.

Operation 

Baselland Transport operates the line as a tramway, designated as Line 10 of the Basel tram network. Two trams operate every fifteen minutes to Ettingen via . South of Basel, these services continue over the Basel–Rodersdorf railway line. Every other tram continues beyond Ettingen to Hofstetten-Flüh or Rodersdorf.

Notes

References

Further reading 
 

Railway lines in Switzerland
Railway lines opened in 1902
1902 establishments in Switzerland
Baselland Transport lines
Metre gauge railways in Switzerland
600 V DC railway electrification